Selenic acid is the inorganic compound with the formula . It is a colorless compound. Although it has few uses, one of its salts, sodium selenate is used in the production of glass and animal feeds.

Structure and bonding
The molecule is tetrahedral, as predicted by VSEPR theory. The Se–O bond length is 161 pm. In the solid state, it crystallizes in an orthorhombic structure.

Preparation
It is prepared by oxidising selenium compounds in lower oxidation states. One method involves the oxidation of selenium dioxide with hydrogen peroxide:

Unlike the production sulfuric acid by hydration of sulfur trioxide, the hydration of selenium trioxide is an impractical method. Instead, selenic acid may also be prepared by the oxidation of selenous acid with halogens, such as chlorine or bromine, or with potassium permanganate. Using chlorine or bromine as the oxidising agents also produces hydrochloric or hydrobromic acid as a side-product, which needs to be removed from the solution since they can reduce the selenic acid to selenous acid.

To obtain the anhydrous acid as a crystalline solid, the resulting solution is evaporated at temperatures below  in a vacuum.

Reactions
Like sulfuric acid, selenic acid is a strong acid that is hygroscopic and extremely soluble in water. Concentrated solutions are viscous. Crystalline mono- and di-hydrates are known. The monohydrate melts at 26 °C, and the dihydrate melts at −51.7 °C.

Selenic acid is a stronger oxidizer than sulfuric acid, capable of liberating chlorine from chloride ions, being reduced to selenous acid in the process:

It decomposes above 200 °C, liberating oxygen gas and being reduced to selenous acid:

Selenic acid reacts with barium salts to precipitate solid , analogous to the sulfate. In general, selenate salts resemble sulfate salts, but are more soluble. Many selenate salts have the same crystal structure as the corresponding sulfate salts.

Treatment with fluorosulfuric acid gives selenoyl fluoride:

Hot, concentrated selenic acid reacts with gold, forming a reddish-yellow solution of gold(III) selenate:

Applications
Selenic acid is used as a specialized oxidizing agent.

References

Oxidizing acids
Oxidizing agents
Oxoacids
Selenates